Ray Montgomery may refer to:

 Ray Montgomery (actor) (1922–1998), American actor
 Ray Montgomery (American football) (1909–1966), American football player
 Ray Montgomery (baseball) (born 1969), retired Major League Baseball outfielder
 Ray Montgomery (umpire) (1929–2009), Australian rules football umpire